Meitav is a military unit created in May 2006 by merging the Bakum (בסיס קליטה ומיון, Bsis Klita UMiyun lit. Reception and Sorting Base) and the Minhag (מנהל הגיוס, Minhal HaGiyus, lit. Recruitment Administration). In practice, it is the unit that oversees new Israel Defense Forces recruits and sorts them into their respective corps or basic training bases, similar to USMEPCOM in the U.S. military. Other responsibilities include (but are not limited to) initial allocation of basic gear and discharging soldiers at the end of their service.

The Reception and Sorting Base, located in Tel HaShomer is still commonly referred to as the Bakum and its new name, Meitav, as the unit's name, is virtually unknown outside the army. A possible reason for this is that meitav is the name of the military unit that resides on the base and is responsible for the different sorting tasks, but not the name of its location.

Meitav's headquarters are located at the Tel HaShomer military base, and its current commander as of March 2023 is Colonel Alon Matzliah.

In 2010, Meitav was the third-largest IDF unit, with 1,026 soldiers.

History
With the founding of the IDF, Meitav was called Kelet and was under the jurisdiction of the manpower branch of the Ministry of Defense. It was located in Tzrifin. The Kelet unit, which inducted soldiers, was separate from the sorting unit/base, which was located in the Kiryat Meir base in Tel Aviv. In the 1950s, the two units were merged into the Bakum, and moved to Tel HaShomer.

In 1966, the jurisdiction of the Bakum passed from the Defense Ministry to the army.

Recruitment Offices
Under Meitav's responsibility is the management of 5 regional recruitment offices across the country (Tel Hashomer, Beer Sheva, Tiberias, Haifa and Jerusalem.
The recruitment offices are in charge of the sorting process for service, including Tzav Rishon, medical exams, interviews and tests.

References

External links 
 Meitav website 

Military installations of Israel
Military units and formations of Israel